Ursuline Sisters can refer to one of several religious institutes:

 Ursulines, founded in Italy in 1535
 Society of the Sisters of Saint Ursula of the Blessed Virgin, established 1606
 Congregation of the Ursulines of the Agonizing Heart of Jesus (Grey Ursulines), est. 1920 (1908)